Jim Buck (28 November 1931 – 4 July 2013) was a New York City dog walker.

He was born James Augustine Farrell Buck in 1931 into a prominent Manhattan family. In 1960 Buck left his job as a salesman to become a professional dog walker, apparently New York and the United States' first. By 1964 Jim Buck’s School for Dogs was making as much as $500 per week and he had hired an assistant. Buck became a well-recognized figure in the Upper East Side: tall, slim, and elegantly dressed, he would walk six or more dogs at a time. Buck operated his business for approximately forty years and, at its peak, employed at least 24 assistants.

Buck died in Manhattan on 4 July 2013 from complications of emphysema and cancer.

References

1931 births
2013 deaths
Businesspeople from New York City
People working with dogs
20th-century American businesspeople